Nicolás Chaparro (born 10 September 1962) is a Paraguayan hurdler. He competed in the men's 110 metres hurdles at the 1984 Summer Olympics.

References

1962 births
Living people
Athletes (track and field) at the 1984 Summer Olympics
Paraguayan male hurdlers
Olympic athletes of Paraguay
Place of birth missing (living people)
20th-century Paraguayan people